Hannibal Old Police Station and Jail, also known a City Hall, is a historic police station and jail located at Hannibal, Marion County, Missouri.  It was built in 1878–1879, and is a two-story, eclectic late Victorian style brick building on a granite foundation. It features two octagonal towers of different heights and a complex roof defined by a heavy bracketed cornice.

It was added to the National Register of Historic Places in 1979.  It is located in the Central Park Historic District.

References

Individually listed contributing properties to historic districts on the National Register in Missouri
Government buildings on the National Register of Historic Places in Missouri
Victorian architecture in Missouri
Government buildings completed in 1879
Buildings and structures in Hannibal, Missouri
National Register of Historic Places in Marion County, Missouri
1879 establishments in Missouri